20 Greatest Hits contains single and album tracks recorded by Glen Campbell between 1965 and 1993.

Track listing

Production
Compilation produced by Bill Kennedy
Mastered by Denny Purcell/Georgetown Masters
Art direction/design – Carlton Davis
Liner notes – Nancy Sweid-Henderson
Photo archivist – Kat Johl
Production assistance – Dennis Jarvis
Digital imager – Colourworks

Charts
Album – Billboard (United States)

References

2000 greatest hits albums
Glen Campbell compilation albums
Capitol Records compilation albums